The Sukhoi Su-15 (Aircraft P) was a prototype Soviet all-weather interceptor which never reached production. The designation was later reused for an entirely different 1960s interceptor, see Sukhoi Su-15.

Development
The Su-15 was an early attempt at an all-weather jet-powered interceptor. Its development was ordered by the Soviet government in March 1947, with the approval of the Sukhoi Design Bureau's preliminary midwing design featuring a pressurized cabin, radar, swept wings and tandem engines, similar to that already attempted by the Lavochkin La-200 and Mikoyan-Gurevich I-320. Per TsAGI, the sweep of the wings was selected to be 35 degrees. The first prototype was completed on 25 October 1948 — only four months after its construction had started. 
The Su-15 first flew on 11 January 1949, piloted by Sukhoi test pilot G. M. Shiyanov.
During the 39th flight on 3 June 1949, the aircraft developed severe vibration, forcing the test pilot S.N. Anokhin to eject. The exact cause of the accident was never determined. At the time of the accident, 90% of the flight test program had been completed, over the course of 42 flights with a total flight time of 20 hours, 15 minutes.
The program was subsequently terminated, and the second prototype was not completed.

The Su-15 was an all-metal mid-wing monoplane with a 35° swept wing. The aircraft had several very unusual design features. Its twin Klimov RD-45 engines were positioned in tandem rather than side-by-side, due to their large diameter. The front engine sat low with its exhaust under the middle of the fuselage. The rear engine nozzle was at the tip of the aft fuselage. The cockpit had to be offset to the left to make room for the air intake ducting for the rear engine.

The wing had two spars with two wing fences ranging the entire chord, with hydraulically operated ailerons and Fowler flaps. The air intake was at the nose and was centrally divided by a central web. At the rear, two-start rockets were mounted and also two air brakes.

Operators

Soviet Air Force

Specifications (Su-15)

See also

References

Su-15 (1949)
1940s Soviet fighter aircraft
Abandoned military aircraft projects of the Soviet Union
Twinjets
Mid-wing aircraft
Aircraft first flown in 1949